Battering Ram is the twenty-first studio album by British heavy metal band Saxon, released on 16 October 2015.

Background
Saxon frontman Biff Byford stated that the band worked on a new album in January, February and March 2015. On 1 August, the band announced 16 October as the release date of Battering Ram and also premiered the official video of the title track worldwide.

Track listing
All music composed by Saxon, all lyrics written by Biff Byford.

Personnel
Saxon
Biff Byford – lead vocals
Paul Quinn – guitar
Doug Scarratt – guitar
Nibbs Carter – bass
Nigel Glockler – drums

Additional musicians
 David Bower – vocals

Production 
 Andy Sneap – production
 Paul Raymond Gregory – artwork

Charts

References

External links
 

2015 albums
Saxon (band) albums
Albums produced by Andy Sneap